Hikmet Şen (born 15 July 1942) is a Turkish long-distance runner. He competed in the men's 5000 metres at the 1972 Summer Olympics.

References

1942 births
Living people
Athletes (track and field) at the 1972 Summer Olympics
Turkish male long-distance runners
Olympic athletes of Turkey
Place of birth missing (living people)
20th-century Turkish people